Special forces units in the Israel Defense Forces encompass a broad definition of specialist units. Such units are usually a regiment or a battalion in strength.

Sayeret (pl.: sayarot), or reconnaissance units in the Israel Defense Forces (IDF) nomenclature, specialize in intelligence gathering and surveillance. In practice, these units specialize in commando and other special forces roles, in addition to reconnaissance (the degree of specialization varies by units and current needs).

Mista'arvim (lit.

Special forces units in the IDF

Unit 101 

Commando Unit 101, the founding Israeli special forces unit, was established and commanded by Ariel Sharon on orders from Prime Minister David Ben-Gurion in August 1953. They were armed with non-standard weapons and tasked with carrying out retribution operations across the state's borders – in particular, establishing small unit maneuvers, activation and tactical insertion and exit tactics.

Members of the unit were recruited only from agricultural Kibbutzim and Moshavim. Membership in the unit was by invitation only, and any new member had to be voted on by all existing members before they were accepted.

The unit was merged into the 890th Paratroop Battalion during January 1954, on orders of General Dayan, Chief of Staff, because he wanted their experience and spirit to be spread among all infantry units of IDF starting with the paratroopers. They are considered to have had a significant influence on the development of subsequent Israeli special forces units.

Sayeret units today 

All combat brigades in the IDF have a unit with improved weaponry and training used for reconnaissance and special forces missions, trained to use advanced weapons and reconnaissance technology, as well as hand-to-hand combat. Historically the brigades used to only have one company-sized unit outfitted to do this job, known as Palsar (Hebrew contraction of: פלוגת-סיור, Plugat Siyur (singular) / Plugot Siyur (plural), "Reconnaissance Company"). Although the Palsar are mostly oriented at battlefield support (which is their raison d'être), many have participated in special operations during recent years. All infantry units as well as some armored units have Palsar.
While in the past there were differences between the Siyur units, due to the experiences of the past decades the IDF is now consolidating them into larger units with many different capabilities: battalion-sized units called Gadsar (contraction of Gdud Siyur, "Reconnaissance battalion"). Each Gadsar is made up of three specialized Plugot (companies): demolitions and combat engineering (Plugat Habalah Handasit, or Palhan), reconnaissance (Plugat Siyur, Palsar) and anti-tank (Pluga Neged Tankim, or Palnat).

On late December 2015, some Ground Force special forces units have been assembled in the Oz Brigade.

Other SF units or Sayaret are larger units, operating directly under the General Staff. They are tasked with the most sensitive missions but they also support other conventional and SF units, if needed. Those units are Sayeret Matkal, Shayetet 13 and Shaldag.

IDF units

Reconnaissance units 

These are the most well-known reconnaissance units. Their operators are proficient in long range solo navigation, as opposed to other special forces units in the IDF where long range navigation is done with a minimum of 2 operators.

General Staff Reconnaissance Unit 269 – Sayeret Matkal – the IDF's principal Sayeret unit, used mainly to obtain strategic intelligence behind enemy lines and to perform hostage-rescue missions on foreign soil. It is directly subordinate to the Israeli Military Intelligence Directorate (AMAN).
13th Flotilla – Shayetet 13 – the naval commando unit, equivalent to the SEAL Team six or British Special Boat Service. It is part of the Israeli Navy and tasked with maritime hostage-rescue missions. Founded in 1948 by former members of the Palyam, the naval branch of the Haganah.
Unit 5101 – Shaldag – founded in 1974 by several former Sayeret Matkal veterans, it is the Israeli Air Force's commando unit, specializing in forward air control, aerial & special reconnaissance, and target designation outside of Israel's borders.

89th "Oz" Brigade 

Unit 212 – Maglan – a commando unit which specializes in operating behind enemy lines.
Unit 217 – Duvdevan – mistaravim unit.
Unit 621 – Egoz – counter-guerrilla unit.

Infantry Corps 
The regular five infantry brigades (Golani, Givati, Nahal, Kfir and the Paratroopers) operate their own Palsars, today joint with Pal'nat and Pal'han to form a "Gad'sar/G'dud Siur", or Reconnaissance Battalion. Each unit is subordinate to a specific brigade command, though they are not restricted to it.
 93rd Reconnaissance Battalion – Kfir Brigade
 631st Reconnaissance Battalion – Golani Brigade
 846th Reconnaissance Battalion – Givati Brigade
 934th Reconnaissance Battalion – Nahal Brigade
 5135th Reconnaissance Battalion – Paratroopers Brigade

Armored Corps 
 Palsar 7 – the 7th Armored Brigade reconnaissance unit.
 Palsar 188 – the 188th Armored Brigade reconnaissance unit.
 Palsar 401 – the 401st Brigade reconnaissance unit.

Artillery Corps 
 Meitar/Moran – a unit operating long range anti-tank Tammuz missiles.
 Sky Rider – a combat unit operating the Elbit Skylark drone.

Combat Engineering Corps 
 Sayeret Yahalom – the engineering special forces unit, its missions range from EOD and bomb disposal to counter-mining warfare.

Combat Intelligence Collection Corps 
 Combat Intelligence Collection Special Forces – tasked with intelligence-gathering, they operate either alone or in conjunction with other IDF units. They also provide target designation in wartime.

Air Force 
 Unit 669 – combat search and rescue unit.
 Unit 5700 – establish Advance airfield and forward airfield.

Navy 
 Shayetet 7 - the unit which operates Israel's submarines.
 Unit Snapir – force protection and harbor security unit.
 Unit YALTAM – defensive divers unit tasked with mine countermeasures, explosive ordnance disposal and salvage and recovery. Not to be confused with Shayetet 13's own underwater unit.

Other units 

 Alpinist – IDF mountain-warfare unit operating in the Golan Heights; provides protection for IDF electronic listening posts on Mount Hermon and Mount Avital. This unit also provides alpine rescue services. (Northern Command).
 General Staff Security Unit – bodyguard unit of the Chief of General Staff and other top dignitaries.
 LOTAR – the IDF counter-terrorism school. Most IDF special forces units mentioned go through weeks of training lead by LOTAR at the Mitkan Adam base, and as such the school includes an operational unit made up by the school's instructors.  
 LOTAR Eilat – reserve force counter-terrorism/hostage-rescue unit based at the southern Israeli port city of Eilat. (Southern Command).
 Oketz – the IDF's special K-9 unit.
 School Of Operational Mobility (BALNAM) – Training of special forces and units from the entire IDF as tactical mobile personnel.

Disbanded units 
 Unit 101 – the first Israeli special forces unit, commanded by Ariel Sharon.
 Samson Unit – Gaza Strip mista'arvim unit.
 Sayeret Shaked – IDF Southern Command special forces unit.
 Sayeret Duchifat – Armored Corps anti-tank unit.
 Sayeret Rimon – Gaza Strip infiltration of terrorists and border infiltration.

Law enforcement

Border Police 
 Yamam – a counter-terrorist unit specializing in hostage-rescue operations and offensive take-over raids against targets in civilian areas
 Yamas – special operations and mista'arvim unit directly subordinate to the Shin Bet.

Police 
 Yasam – quick response and riot police unit.
 Gideonim – undercover and mistaravim unit. 
 YAGAL – counter-smuggling unit.

Prison Service 
 Metzada unit – quick response and intervention force and specializes in suppression of prisoner uprisings.
 Nahshon – intervention and conveyance unit; deals with searches, silencing disturbances, guarding IPS staff, etc.
 Dror – counter-narcotics unit

See also
 Mista'arvim – Undercover counter-terrorism personnel/units specifically trained to assimilate among the local Arab population. They are commonly tasked with performing intelligence gathering, law enforcement, hostage rescue and counter-terrorism, and to use disguise and surprise as their main weapons.
 Mossad – Israel's covert intelligence and special operations agency abroad.
 Kidon – a department within Mossad that is allegedly responsible for selective high-profile assassination.
 Aman – Israel's military intelligence agency.
 Shin Bet – Israel's internal security agency.
 Oz Brigade – the Ground Forces formation grouping some of the Israeli special forces units.
 Israel's Arab Warriors – a documentary on the Arab soldiers of the IDF.

References

External links
 IDF official Website
 isayeret.com – Israeli Special Forces Database

 
Israel Defense Forces